The Korea Fair Trade Commission (KFTC) is South Korea's regulatory authority for economic competition. It was established in 1981 within the Economic Planning Board. The establishing law was the Monopoly Regulation and Fair Trade Act (MRFTA), Law No. 3320, December 31, 1980. In 1994, the Fair Trade Commission and its secretariat were separated from the Economic Planning Board as an independent vice ministerial-level, central administrative organization. In 1996, the status of the KFTC Chairman was elevated from vice-ministerial to ministerial level.

Organization
The original KFTC had five commissioners from 1981 to 1990. This was increased to seven commissioners from 1990 to 1997. Since 1997 the KFTC has had nine commissioners, which includes a Chairman who serves for fixed three years, a Vice-Chairman, and three other standing commissioners. There are four non-standing commissioners. Their terms can only be renewed for once. The KFTC is supported in its work by a secretariat.

Kim Sang-jo, who is known as the “chaebol sniper,” became the first chairperson of the organisation under Moon Jae-in's administration. In 2022, President Yoon Suk-yeol named Seoul National University (SNU) law professor Han Ki-jeong, as chair of the agency.

Enforcement
Apart from the MRFTA, the KFTC enforces the following statutes:

 Adhesion Contract Act, Law No. 3922, December 31, 1986.
 Fair Labelling and Advertising Act, Law No. 5814, February 5, 1999.
 Omnibus Cartel Repeal Act, Law No. 5815, February 5, 1999.
 Door-to-Door Sales Act, Law No. 4481, December 31, 1991.
 Installment Transactions Act, Law No. 4480, December 31, 1991.
 Fair Subcontract Transactions Act, Law No. 3799, December 31, 1984.
 Fair Franchise Transactions Act, Law No. 6704, May 13, 2002.
 Consumer Protection in Electronic Commerce Act, Law No. 6687, March 30, 2002.

Notable cases tackled

2005 Microsoft decision
On December 7, 2005, the KFTC reached the decision to order Microsoft Corporation and Microsoft Korea, inter alia, to unbundle certain tied products, including Windows Media Player and MSN Messenger, and to impose surcharges amounting to 33 billion won (31 million US dollars) for violation of the Monopoly Regulation and Fair Trade Act (MRFTA), including the abuse of market dominant position provision. On October 16, 2007, the Associated Press reported that Microsoft has stopped appealing the December 2005 decision and has withdrawn the appeal.

2011 music price fixing scandalFTC's statement on the music price-fixing allegations (in Korean) 
On February 28, 2011, the KFTC declared, 
"Through a meeting held from February 23rd through the 25th, we have decided to take appropriate action against the following 15 online music-related companies: SK Telecom, LOEN Entertainment, KT, KT Music, Mnet Media, Neowiz Bugs, Sony Music Entertainment Korea, Universal Music, Warner Music Korea, Yejun Media, Pony Canyon Korea, S.M. Entertainment, SBS Contents Hub, King Pin Entertainment, Direct Media."

The FTC alleged that the companies decided to rig the market once non-DRM (digital rights management) digital songs were allowed to be downloaded, starting May 2008 (previously, only DRM songs were allowed on the market). Non-DRM songs allow for infinite downloads, which led companies to discontinue products and certificates that catered to non-DRM songs.  Thirteen of the companies listed above also stopped distributing songs to services which offered infinite downloads, thus rigging the market.

A representative of the FTC revealed, 
"In order to block competition coming from smaller businesses, the companies listed above rigged their own prices. By rigging the prices in compliance with one another, they placed great harm on the consumers and other businesses in the industry.  Indeed, by equalizing the prices of their products, they've made the music industry believe that such a phenomenon was permanent. They have completely set up a blockade against the production of products that fit in different price categories. This is a violation of the consumer's right of choice."

The representative continued, 
"With this action, we hope that consumers will be able to spend less in order to enjoy a greater diversity of products. This is the first action being taken for the online music industry.  No one is free when prices are rigged, so we hope other companies support this effort."

Recommendations
The fines for each company are: 
 SK Telecom (fined $1.96 million USD)
 LOEN Entertainment (fined $9.69 million) 
 KT (fined $811,000) 
 KT Music (fined $1.16 million)
 Mnet Media (fined $1.98 million)
 Neowiz Bugs (fined $1.11 million)
 Sony Music Entertainment (fined $1.19 million)
 Universal Music (fined $814,000)
 Warner Music Korea (fined $96,000)

Five of the above companies (SK Telecom, LOEN Entertainment, KT Music, Mnet Media, and Neowiz Bugs) will be formally accused of their crimes.

LOEN Entertainment's CEO Shin Won-soo,  KT Music's CEO Kim Min-wook and Mnet Media's CEO Kim Sung-soo will be prosecuted separately.

See also
Competition law
Competition policy
Competition regulator
Consumer protection

References

External links
Official English language website of the KFTC
Official KFTC English Decision in Microsoft Case PDF 
Microsoft wants to drop antitrust appeal in South Korea

Government agencies of South Korea
Consumer organizations in South Korea
Competition regulators
Regulation in South Korea